HaAh HaGadol VIP 2 (lit. The Big Brother VIP 2) started on May 10, 2015. This is the second VIP season of the Israeli version of the Big Brother series, after a first one back in 2009. The show follows the main Big Brother rules, but with some changes. For example, in Big Brother VIP the show's duration is shorter and the housemates were Israeli celebrities.

Housemates

Ariana 
Ariana Melamed is a journalist. She has two children. When she was 8 years old, she was involved in a car crash and stayed in the bed for 3 years. She loves to read. She was kicked out from every place she worked even from IDF. She is the biggest critic of Big Brother but she wants to see how it is from inside. She thinks that this season will be more interesting than the previous one.

Israel 
Israel Goodovitch is an architect. He was "street boy" as a kid but he always pretends to be a nice boy with clean hands. He wanted to work in the theater but his father doesn’t approve it. He is architect of many buildings and stadiums. He hates someone to pull his strings. He doesn’t want to leave the planet without to try everything.

Itzik 
Itzik Zohar is a footballer and sports commenter. He loves football since he is very young. He loves to be a star. He likes the hair style of George Michael. He fixed his first football shoes because they were bigger than his size. On age of 17 he already was top footballer. He got slap in the face when he got trauma on the leg, and he thinks that it happens when a man thinks that he is bigger than life.

Katya 
Katya Gali is a model. She was born in Moscow. In the past her family thinks that to be smart is better than to be beautiful and she left Russia. She starts modeling in London, Paris, etc. She met her husband in England. They moved to Israel. But her husband wasn’t happy. Then he involved her with heroin. She want to leave him but she is afraid to stay alone, so she becomes drug addict. Everything in her family life starts to fall down. She becomes homeless. She is clean from 3 years and continues to fight.

Moshik 
Moshik Afia is a singer. He is divorced without children. He was married for two years. He has success with a song, get a lot of money but he spent them fast and the money are past. Now he is a different person and "doesn’t live in a movie" anymore. He hates unnecessary hair on his body. He is sensitive. He watches telenovelas and cry easy when he watches.

Moti 
Moti Giladi is an actor and a singer, represented Israel in the Eurovision Song Contest 1986 (Along with Sarai Tzuriel). He found his talent of imitation from young age. His first wife died at 46. He confessed how hard it was then when he knew what will happen in his home and to go on stage and to make the public laugh. After her death he thought that he will never return to the stage but his children gave him strength to do so.

Natalie 
Natalie Attaya is an actress and model. She spent many years in trying to like herself, because in the past she never likes herself. She hates the word "relationship". In marriage she feels that the walls smash her. She prefers piece swimsuit than bikini. She wants to be in Big Brother because she feels that here she will start something new.

Niro 
Nir "Niro" Levy is an actor. He wasn’t the best athlete, the best student or the beauties boy. A girl told him "why you not become an actor". Then another girl in America told him the same and he started to work on it. Then he had a romance with a girl who looks like Nicole Kidman. She was very rich but one day she "kicked" him out. He doesn’t have idea what he will do in the house.

Rotem 
Rotem Aizak is a journalist. She likes Beyonce. In her childhood she never believes that she is beautiful. She likes to write articles about sex. She doesn’t believe in monogamy. She searches for mister big…heart. She is tough girl. Her father asked her "Who will be your boyfriend? Ballerina?"

Shir 
Shir Elmaliach is a model. She is model since she was 17. She wants to have blue eyes. When she was little girl she wanted to be a singer. She is together with her husband since she was in school, and he is the only man in her life. If she is the first evicted, it will be shame for her. She is afraid to not fall from the stairs.

Stav 
Stav Strashko is a trans model. She was born in Ukraine. Her family came to Israel when she was 2 years old. She was quiet kid, she loved to play with dresses but also with robots. When she became a model she said to herself that she could be a beautiful girl. (She identified as male as the time.) She has a boyfriend who accepts her body like it is. The men flirt with her on the street but she hates it when someone opens the door of her car, thinking that she will do something with him. She doesn’t like how she looks in the morning.

Stella 
Stella Amar is a model and writer. In America she is famous with the name Stella Ellis. Jean-Paul Gaultier discovers her in the early 1990s and she becomes his muse. Stella Ellis was featured in Italian Vogue, French Vogue, Elle, Glamour, Oprah's magazine and many others. She has participation in projects of George Michel and Madonna. She writes the book "Size Sexy" for the women which doesn’t know how to accept themselves and wants to show that a woman can be a model even if she is not abnormally thin woman.

Nominations table

Notes 

 : Shir entered first in the house and received a secret task from Big Brother. She was hidden in the Diary Room and she watched the promo videos of every housemate who enters after her. Her task was to say, according to what she thinks from the promos, who will be the first evicted and who will be the winner. After the entering of the housemates, she announced her decision in Diary Room. According to Shir, Israel will be the first evicted and Katya will be the winner. Because of that, Israel was automatically nominated and Katya will live in a special area of the house, where she'll have the luxury.
 : Israel, Rotem, Niro, Moty, Ariana and Itzik were initially nominated. However, as a new housemate, Stella had the power to save one of the nominees and replace him. She chose to save Itzik and replaced him with Shir.
 : Rotem, Niro, Katya, Itzik, Moty and Natalie were initially nominated. However, after Itzik won a task, he saved himself and replaced him with Stav.
 : This week nominees were determined by the weekly task. There would be 3 games, and whoever stays in the prison after the final of the task would be nominated. They were Niro, Stella, Moshik and Natalie.
 : Niro, Stella, Moshik and Natalie were initially nominated. However, after Stella won a task, she saved herself and replaced her with Shir.
 : Niro, Stella, Rotem and Itzik were initially nominated. However, after Stella won a task, she saved herself and replaced her with Moshik.
 : Everyone was automatically nominated, with two housemates being evicted on Sunday.
 : The public voted for who they wanted to win.

Nominations totals received

External links 
Official VIP website 

VIP 02
2015 Israeli television seasons
Israel 02